Jonathan Sisson Cooper was Dean of Ferns from 1897 until his death on 18 February 1898.

Alfred William Francis Cooper, Archdeacon of Calgary from 1895 to 1898, was his son.

Notes

Alumni of Trinity College Dublin
Deans of Ferns
1820 births
1898 deaths